Jason Moses Estrada (born November 30, 1980) is an American former professional boxer who competed from 2004 to 2015. As an amateur, he competed at the 2004 Olympic Games in the super heavyweight division. He also won the gold medal at the 2003 Pan American Games.

Professional career
Known as "Big Six", Estrada turned professional in 2004 and won fifteen of his first sixteen bouts, with one no-contest. His current record is 20-4. Jason makes his home in Providence, Rhode Island.

Jason lost by decision to 2004 Olympic Gold Medalist Alexander Povetkin on April 4, 2009 in Düsseldorf, Germany. Estrada's last fought on November 10, 2012.

Training career
Estrada owns Big Six Boxing Academy in Providence, Rhode Island and co-trained Sam Hyde for his victorious debut on the undercard of 2 Fights 1 Night in 2022. Estrada also co-trained YouTuber Brandon Buckingham who won in the first round by stoppage against fellow Youtuber Ice Poseidon in 2022.

Promoting career
Estrada is part owner of the promotional company, Big Six Entertainment, LLC formed in 2011.

Personal life
Estrada is half-Puerto Rican, and he has one child named "Lennox".

Amateur career
 Three time United States amateur super heavyweight gold medalist (2001, 2002, 2003)(set record for first super heavyweight to three-peat)
 Three time National PAL amateur super heavyweight gold medalist (2001, 2002, 2003)
 Three time National Challenge super heavyweight gold medalist (2001, 2002, 2003)(set record for first boxer to three-peat)
 United States amateur heavyweight silver medalist (2000)
 United States amateur heavyweight bronze medalist (1999)
 Two time National Junior Olympics gold medalist, 165 and 201 lbs (1996, 1997)
 National Junior Police Athletic League gold medalist (1997)
 2003 Male Boxer of the Year by USA Boxing
 Gold medalist at the 2003 Pan American Games 

Estrada's results as a United States super heavyweight representative at the 2004 Athens Olympics were:
 Defeated Ma'afu Hawke (Tonga) 30-11
 Lost to Michel López Núñez (Cuba) 7-21

Professional boxing record

References

External links
 
 Jason Estrada Professional Bio – Boxing360.com
 Jason's Gym

1980 births
Living people
Boxers from Rhode Island
American boxing trainers
Super-heavyweight boxers
Olympic boxers of the United States
Boxers at the 2003 Pan American Games
Boxers at the 2004 Summer Olympics
Sportspeople from Providence, Rhode Island
Winners of the United States Championship for amateur boxers
American male boxers
African-American boxers
American people of Puerto Rican descent
Pan American Games gold medalists for the United States
Pan American Games medalists in boxing
Medalists at the 2003 Pan American Games